Donald Kirsch (September 29, 1920 – May 7, 1970) was a college baseball coach at the University of Oregon for 23 years.

Early life and playing career
Kirsch was born in Portland, Oregon in 1920. He attended Jefferson High School where he played basketball and baseball. He played on three Portland Interscholastic League championship baseball teams and was all-PIL in both baseball and basketball.

After graduating from high school, Kirsch attended the University of Oregon, where he played baseball and basketball for Howard Hobson, who was coach of both teams. Kirsch was a three-year letterman in both sports.

Coaching career
In 1948, Hobson left Oregon to coach basketball at Yale, and Kirsch was named to succeed him as the Ducks' baseball coach. In his 23 years as head coach, Kirsch never had a losing season. Under his leadership, the Ducks won five Northern Division titles, and in
1954, led the Ducks to the 1954 College World Series. Though the team was eliminated in two straight games, this marked Oregon's only appearance in the College World Series. Kirsch was named District VIII coach of the year in 1963.

Illness and death
In 1967, Kirsch was diagnosed with Parkinson's disease. He continued to coach the Ducks until 1970, when he stepped down as coach to pursue experimental medical treatment at Stanford University Medical Center. On May 7, 1970, Kirsch fell from a second-story balcony at Stanford Hospital into a courtyard, and died soon afterwards from massive head injuries.

Legacy
Kirsch was named to the American Baseball Coaches Association Hall of Fame in 1972, the Oregon Sports Hall of Fame in 1981, the University of Oregon Sports Hall of Fame in 1993, and the Portland Interscholastic League Sports Hall of Fame in 2005.

References

Oregon Ducks baseball players
Oregon Ducks baseball coaches
Accidental deaths from falls
1920 births
1970 deaths
Accidental deaths in California
Jefferson High School (Portland, Oregon) alumni
Baseball players from Portland, Oregon